Ramiro Navarro de Anda (born 25 May 1943) is a Mexican former football forward who played for Mexico in the 1966 FIFA World Cup.

Career
Born in Tepatitlán, Jalisco, Navarro began playing football with Club Deportivo Tenería. He would play professionally with CD Oro.

References

External links
FIFA profile

1943 births
Mexican footballers
Mexico international footballers
Association football forwards
CD Oro footballers
Liga MX players
1966 FIFA World Cup players
Living people